Poggiodomo is a comune (municipality) in the Province of Perugia in the Italian region Umbria, located about 80 km southeast of Perugia.

Poggiodomo borders the following municipalities: Cascia, Cerreto di Spoleto, Monteleone di Spoleto, Sant'Anatolia di Narco, Vallo di Nera.

References

External links
Thayer's Gazetteer of Umbria

Cities and towns in Umbria